Copaifera is a genus of tropical plants in the legume family Fabaceae.

The scientific name means "copal-bearer" (or more accurately, copaiba-bearer), since economically important resins and essential oils can be acquired from them. They are also important for production of biodiesel and wood, especially Copaifera langsdorffii. Other species are threatened, mainly by deforestation.

Oil extracts from the genus are of particular interest as a source of antimycobacterial agents.

Notable species
Copaifera epunctata
Copaifera guyanensis
Copaifera langsdorffii – Diesel tree, kerosene tree, kupa'y, cabismo, copaúva
Copaifera martii
Copaifera multijuga 
Copaifera officinalis
Copaifera panamensis – Cabimo
Copaifera reticulata
Copaifera salikounda
Copaifera trapezifolia
Copaifera cearensis
Copaifera jacquinii
Copaifera coriacea

See also
Copaene

References 

 
Fabaceae genera
Taxonomy articles created by Polbot